Buffalo Lake is an unincorporated locality in northwest Alberta, Canada within the County of Grande Prairie No. 1. The locality is on Highway 59 within proximity of Buffalo Lake for which it is named. Buffalo Lake is one of a group of lakes referred to as Buffalo Lakes (other lakes named are Jones Lake and Gummer Lake). Bison were known to use the lakes as a watering hole and to wallow in the shallow waters as a respite from heat and insects. Many buffalo skulls were found in the area by early settlers.

The first public building in Buffalo Lake was the Anglican Church, built in 1913.  In 1918, the United Farmers of Alberta Hall was built a half-mile east of the church. In 1917, the Buffalo Lake post office was established. Businesses in the community included a blacksmith shop, a livery stable, a café and two garages. A curling rink was built in the mid-1930s across the road west of the store. The present hall was built in about 1950. Buffalo Lakes School District was established in 1914.

The post office closed in 1952. The hall closed circa 2010, but the building remains on site.

References 

Localities in the County of Grande Prairie No. 1